The 2012 Maldives FA Cup was the 25th edition of the Maldives FA Cup.

The cup winner was guaranteed a spot in the 2013 AFC Cup.

FA Cup 2012 opening that was scheduled for 2 May 2012, but was postponed to 10 May 2012, by the FAM.

Teams

Club All Youth Linkage
Club Amigos
Club Eagles
Club Green Streets
Club PK
Club Riverside
Club Valencia
Hurriyya Sports Club
Kelaa Naalhi Sports
Kudahuvadhoo Sports Club

Mandhoo Youth Relation
Maziya S&RC
Muiveyo Friends Club
Nolhivaranfaru Youth Development
New Radiant SC
TC Sports Club
VB Addu FC
Victory SC
Vyansa
Youth Revolution Club

First round proper

Second round proper
In this round, the entire 8 league clubs will take part. Among the 12 non-league teams who participated in the first knockout round, Hurriyyaa SC and Muiveyo Friends Club were advanced to the second round.

Quarter-finals

Semi-finals

Third-place play-off

Final

Goal scorers

References

External links
 Maldives FA Cup Official page at Facebook

Maldives FA Cup seasons
FA Cup